Conneaut Lake Park  is a summer resort and event venue located in Conneaut Lake, Pennsylvania, United States. It has long served as a regional tourist destination, and was noted by roller coaster enthusiasts for its classic Blue Streak coaster, which was classified as "historic" by the American Coaster Enthusiasts group in 2010. Conneaut Lake is Pennsylvania's largest natural (glacier) lake, and is a popular summer destination for recreational boaters due to there being no horsepower limit on the lake.

History

Exposition Park

Conneaut Lake Park was founded in 1892 as Exposition Park by Col. Frank Mantor as a permanent fairground and exposition for livestock, machinery, and industrial products from Western Pennsylvania. Prior to this time, 7 acres of land on which the park is located were purchased in 1877 by Aaron Lynce for use as a boat landing. Col. Mantor's company, the Conneaut Lake Exposition Company, purchased an additional 175 acres of adjacent land, 75 of which were given to Mr. Lynce as payment for his parcel.

During its early years, buildings at Exposition Park included a dance hall, a convention hall (for lectures), and a bathhouse. Several of the structures from Lynce's landing were also retained, including a farmhouse on the property that was converted to a hotel. The park's first mechanical ride, a carousel, opened in 1899, and was soon joined by other rides and a midway.

Ownership of the park transferred to the Pittsburgh & Shenango Valley Railroad in 1901, during which time several hotels were built on the property. Originally accessible only by boat or train, trolley service was extended to the park in 1907. With its lakefront presence, hotels, and remote location, the park became a popular resort destination.  Although many of the park's original buildings were lost in a fire in 1908, new concrete block replacements were constructed, including the Dreamland Ballroom.

Name change and growth
The park was renamed "Conneaut Lake Park" in 1920 to reflect a move toward more amusements and rides. Rides added over these years included a Tumble Bug, a bumper car ride, and a Figure Eight roller coaster (later renamed The Jack Rabbit). In 1938, the park's signature roller coaster, Blue Streak, was added.

In 1943, a large portion of a hotel on the properties, Hotel Conneaut, was destroyed in a fire. The ghost of Elizabeth, a bride who supposedly died in the fire, is said to now haunt the hotel.

Facing competition from corporate-owned theme parks, the park added a jungle cruise ride and other new attractions in the 1960s. As trolley service had been discontinued, the park's management began to focus on directing automobile traffic to the park. "Fairyland Forest," a walk-through attraction, was constructed across the highway from the park's main entrance. Using a combination of fairy tale characters and animals to help attract families and appeal to young children, many similar attractions existed across the country at that time. Although popular, the area eventually fell into neglect and closed in 1985. It was replaced with a camper lot called Camperland in 1986.

Ownership changes and decline

By the 1990s, a series of ownership changes had taken their toll on the park. A 1974 takeover of the park by Dr. John and Mary Gene Winslow Flynn had saddled the park with $750,000 in debt, and expansion slowed.  Charles Flynn, long-time associate of New York City mayor Ed Koch and son of Dr. John and Mary Gene decided to leave politics and become actively involved in the family business. Initially, this change in management was able to invigorate the park. In the early 1980s, rides such as the Paratrooper and Yo-Yo were added. The waterfront was improved. Along the park's midway, a waterslide tower was added, which proved popular.

For most of its history, Conneaut Lake Park functioned as a real-life community within an amusement park, as local traffic and waterfront cottages were interspersed with the amusement rides. Park Avenue and Comstock Street, the park's main walking paths, were shared by both patrons and vehicles alike. Although bothersome at times, locals were proud of this arrangement's unique appeal. In an effort to remain competitive, the decision was made to enclose the park for the 1990 season.  For the first time in its long history, admission would be charged. In a letter to customers explaining the changes, Flynn stated, "Traditional parks are dropping like flies and it's time we all realize that we have to take steps now and save our park before its too late to do anything about it."

The new gated park format, coupled with a rainy summer, led to a decline in attendance. In an effort to raise capital, several rides were sold off. After another disastrous season, a decision was announced: the park, with the exception of the water park, would be leveled and a new family entertainment complex would be built on the property. The new family entertainment complex would focus on special events, concerts, group picnics, and non-ride activities, such as batting cages, mazes, and sports activities. The Blue Streak rollercoaster, which required an estimated $100,000 in repairs, would be scrapped.

As the park's rides were auctioned off, a group of four local businessmen made a concerted effort to purchase as many of them as possible.  This group went on to purchase the park from the Flynn family in an attempt to preserve it as a traditional amusement park. Although nearly $1 million was spent in upgrading and refurbishing the park, attendance continued to dwindle, in part due to a public perception that the park had closed altogether.

In 1995, the owners filed for bankruptcy and the park did not open. However, by the 1996 season, a group called Summer Resorts, Inc., under the leadership of Gary Harris, completed a purchase of the park. Although Harris arrived at Conneaut Lake with a history of criminal charges, residents were optimistic that the park could be saved under his leadership. The park reopened on July 4, 1996, but new problems arose in 1997 when Harris was convicted of tax evasion. To help extricate himself from his legal difficulties, Harris gave the debt-ridden park to the Conneaut Lake community in 1997, but later filed a lawsuit claiming that he held a 99-year lease on the park grounds and retained ownership of several rides. When that lawsuit was lost in 2001, ownership reverted to a court-appointed trustee.

Early 2000s and rebirth

The park began the new century under the oversight of a non-profit corporation, The Trustees of Conneaut Lake Park. During this time, the park experienced a renewed interest, driven in part by roller coaster and amusement park enthusiast groups. Several of the park's rides, including the Devil's Den and the Blue Streak, were repaired by volunteers. In August of 2010, the park received $50,000 in funds from a contest sponsored by Pepsi for use in restoring the Blue Streak.

Several fires destroyed buildings on the property, including a fire in 2008 that destroyed the Dreamland Ballroom, a fire on August 1, 2013, that destroyed the dockside restaurant and the beach front building, and a fire on January 4, 2022 that destroyed part of the historic Blue Streak rollercoaster and the nearby woods.

Timeline

1890s
 1892: Exposition Park opened.

1900s
 1902: Figure Eight roller coaster opened.
 1908: A large portion of the midway, many hotels, a bowling alley and the park's ballroom were destroyed in a fire.
 1909: Dreamland Ballroom opened, replacing the original ballroom lost in the 1908 fire. Scenic Railway roller coaster opened.

1920s
 1920: Park was renamed Conneaut Lake Park.
 1925: Tumble Bug ride was installed.
 1925: Temple of Music opened.

1930s
 1935: Beach Club bar opened.
 1936: Figure Eight roller coaster closed.
 1937: Scenic Railway roller coaster closed.
 1938: Blue Streak roller coaster opened.

1940s 
 1946: Temple of Music was destroyed by fire.
 1949: Tilt-A-Whirl opened.

1960s
 1961: Fun House opened in former bowling alley. Wild Mouse roller coaster opened.
 1968: Devil's Den opened.

1970s 
 1973: Dracula's Cave (Pit of Death) opened on the former site of the Cuddle-Up.
 1974: Dr. John Flynn and Mrs. Mary Gene Winslow Flynn, son-in-law and daughter of Dr. Winslow, buy out the other partners, saddling the park with $750,000 in debt.
 1975: Fun House closed. The Scrambler was moved into the gutted building, black lights, strobes, and loud music are added, and it was renamed the Ultimate Trip.
 1976: Hell-Hole rotor ride opened.

1980s
 1981: Charles Winslow Flynn, son of Dr. and Mrs. Flynn, took over operation of the park.
 1985: Dracula's Cave (Pit of Death) closed; the building was converted to locker rooms and showers for the water park. Fairyland Forest closed.
 1986: Camperland opened on the site of Fairyland Forest. Cliffhanger Falls was built.

1990s 
 1990: New front gate constructed. Wild Mouse roller coaster closed.
 1991: Connie Otter's Kiddie Cove and Otter Creek Adventure River were built behind Cliffhanger Falls, creating water park Splash City.
 1992: Devil's Den was renamed Dr. Moriarity's Wild Ride. Conneaut Lake Park celebrated its 100th anniversary. At the end of the season, it was announced that many rides would be removed and the Blue Streak roller coaster would be mothballed. The Hell Hole rotor ride is removed. At the end of the season, the Flynn family sold the park.
 1993: Local businessmen purchase some of the rides at auction to keep Conneaut Lake Park as an amusement park. Management lost $125,000 in operations.
 1994: Lost $800,000.
 1995: Conneaut Lake Park failed to open due to bankruptcy.
 1996: Conneaut Lake Park was purchased by Gary Harris. Conneaut Lake Park reopened on July 4, however, the Blue Streak did not reopen with the rest of the park.
 1997: Conneaut Lake Park began operation under a non-profit. The Blue Streak roller coaster was renovated and the park purchased four rides from the now-closed Old Indiana Fun Park: the Super Round Up, the Dodg'ems, the Ranger (Sky Thriller), and the Chance Turbo. The Chance Turbo was never installed due to a dispute over ownership. An 8-tub model of the Flying Scooters ride was also added. Former owner Garry Harris went to prison for tax evasion.
 1999: The Board of Trustees dwindled to one member, and Gene Rumsey and Bill Jorden become the court appointed custodians of Conneaut Lake Park. The Conneaut Lake Park Management Group also began to operate Conneaut Lake Park. Conneaut Lake's annual Fall Pumpkin Fest was moved to the park. The park also purchased a Roll-O-Plane ride and opened it.

2000s
 2000: On June 28, the managers of the park were ousted and the park was closed for four days before the trustees assumed control.
 2001: Bill Jorden was replaced by Herbert Brill as the court-appointed custodian of Conneaut Lake Park. Gene Rumsey and Mary Ellen Rebrassier manage Conneaut Lake Park for the season. Dr. Moriarity's Wild Ride was given its original name back, Devil's Den.
 2002: The original 1937 trains were put back onto the Blue Streak roller coaster, putting the NAD Century Flyer trains from the 1960s into retirement. Park purchased and opened the Toboggan roller coaster.
 2003: Park was approved to open the day before Labor Day when Lake View Ford loaned Conneaut Lake Park the money it needed to open. New Board of Trustees was formed on July 15. Park hosted first annual "Holiday in the Park" event in December. A book, The Ghosts of Hotel Conneaut and Conneaut Lake Park was written, sparking ghost hunts, television coverage, and events such as the annual Spiritual Expo at Conneaut Lake Park. Gene Rumsey resigned as park manager at the end of the season.
 2004: Griffin Motors loaned Conneaut Lake Park the money it needed to open. Mary Ellen Rebrassier, CEO, was replaced with Don Kaltenbaugh on June 16. Herbert Brill, court-appointed custodian, was replaced by Leroy Stearns, who took over during mid-summer. Tim Kaider resigned as Chairman of the Board of Trustees and Abe Finton assumed the position.
 2005: The park attempted to introduce a tiger animal attraction, but after a lengthy public protest from a Pittsburgh-based animal rights group, Voices for Animals, and including several thousand petition signatures from the park's patrons, it was withdrawn later in the season. The Board of Trustees was ordered by Judge Vardaro to open the park for the season without borrowing any money. Don Kaltenbaugh resigned and more Board Members were added, including George Deshner, Dick Williams, David Gordan, and chairman Terry Deitz. Tom Cholak and Harold Thornton were hired as managers of the park. The park leased the Beach Club, Camperland, and multiple games in order to get money to open the park for the season. Trevor Samios and John Raucci were hired as Event Coordinators for the park. A new book, Images of America: Conneaut Lake Park, was published by Michael E. Costello and Arcadia Publishing, sparking renewed interest in the park. In August, the park, still under custody of the Crawford County court, had its 12-member operating board dissolved due to its failure to file a required financial report two months earlier. The park management was awarded to former school principal George Deshner and local humane society operator LeRoy Stearns.
 2006: The Flynn House, where the Flynn family lived when they owned the park, was demolished in a controlled burn. Conneaut Lake Institute began its "Brick-by-Brick" fundraising campaign to raise funds to repair the park's ridable miniature railroad. The Yoyo ride was finally dismantled after sitting idle for 3 years, and was subsequently sold. The Witch's Stew (Tempest) ride was reintroduced. The Bessemer Railway System reopened to the public on July 2. The park's historic Tumble Bug ride reopened to the public on July 8. Conneaut Lake Park continued to operate without a board of trustees. Deshner and Stearns announced that the park lost approximately $400,000 dollars that season. In an attempt to pay off a large portion of the park's debt, Stearns tried to sell  of lakefront property. The Ferris Wheel was retired at the end of the season.
 2007: On May 22, it was announced that the resort would not open for the 2007 season due to lack of funds. The Trustees of Conneaut Lake Park, Inc. had earlier attempted to raise funds through the sale of tokens, but were unsuccessful. The Trustees then sought a six-figure gift to open the park, but finding no donors, announced the park would not open. Heavily in debt ($2 million), the park was unable to borrow the funds needed to open.
 2008: On February 1, the Dreamland Ballroom was destroyed in a massive fire.  On April 6, the bowling alley collapsed.  In April several scenes from the 2009 movie The Road were filmed at the park, including near the ruins of the Dreamland Ballroom, which caught fire two months before filming commenced. 
 2009: The resort opened on Memorial Day weekend. The amusement park opened in its entirety later in the summer.

2010s
 2010: The park opened with all but 4 rides functional: the Blue Streak, the Roll-O-Plane, the Toboggan and the Super Round-Up. Splash City opened on July 4. The coaster convention from ACE (American Coaster Enthusiasts) was held at the park on June 23, and the Blue Streak was declared a historic coaster. An arson fire destroyed Kiddieland's restrooms. On September 2, the Blue Streak reopened through September 6. The Skydiver ride closed, and was removed from the park.
 2011: The Trustees of Conneaut Lake Park, Inc. and Swank's Steel City Shows entered an agreement to assume operations for the 2011 season. Under the agreement, four new portable attractions are installed, including The Jitterbug, the Fun Slide, the Go-Gator, and the Jumpin' Star. The Roll-O-Plane ride was removed from the park. After Labor Day, Swank's Steel City Shows ended the agreement with the Trustees of Conneaut Lake Park, Inc. and removed their attractions and equipment. Splash City closed this season, and remained closed for six years.
 2012: The amusement park opened on Labor Day with the following attractions: Carousel, Tilt-A-Whirl, Flying Scooter, Bessemer Railway, Music Express, Devil's Den, Witch's Stew, Trabant, all Kiddieland Rides, and the Pony Track.
 2013: A fire destroyed the Beach Club and Dockside Pavilion on August 1. On August 3, the new attraction, Hostile Hostel, a walk-through dark ride, opened. An opening ceremony for it was held during the filming of a pilot episode of a show titled Mission Amusement.
 2014: The park opened on May 23. The park considered the possibility of a tax sale in September, as it owed more than $910,000 in overdue property taxes. The Toboggan was removed from the park in September and put up for sale. Witch's Stew, Musik Express, and the Kiddie Carousel were also put up for sale. All rides put up for sale were not sold, and remained in operation the following year, with the exception of the Toboggan, which was kept in storage. In December, after many failed attempts of trying to appeal a Sheriff's sale of the park (with the sale then scheduled for December 5), the park filed for bankruptcy to stop the sale. The Super Round-Up ride was also removed from the park.
 2015: The park opened on May 22. Despite Chapter 11 bankruptcy proceedings, the courts allowed the trustees to secure loans to open the park. The park listed eleven operating rides, plus eleven more in Kiddieland. A new pump and spout was added to the Front Gate Fountain early in the season.
2016: Splash City opened for the first time in six years. Several areas throughout the park were cleaned up and reopened, including the area next to the Tumble Bug and the entrance to Splash City. The fencing around the Tumble Bug was removed and replaced with a shorter fence. A concessions stand was bought and placed in Splash City across from the entrance to the Lazy River. The first drop of the Blue Streak roller coaster was re-tracked.
2017: The park opened on May 27 for its 125th anniversary, along with Splash City. The picnic shelters on Reed Avenue were demolished to make room for a parking lot. A new entrance for the park was constructed across from the parking lot.
2018: The park opened on May 26. The second drop of the Blue Streak roller coaster was re-tracked, and the Tumble Bug was repainted. The park also announced the addition of a Ferris Wheel for the 2019 season.
2019: The park opened with two new rides and numerous improvements.  A regular-sized Ferris Wheel was installed the end of the midway facing the lake, and a small Ferris Wheel was completely refurbished and returned to Kiddieland after an absence. Splash City's buildings and Kiddieland's carousel and boat ride received new roofs. The train and bumper cars received new theming, the midway asphalt was patched, several rides and buildings were repainted, and work continued on the historic Blue Streak coaster. The season also saw a successful collaboration between EPACC, employees, and volunteers.

2020s
2020: The park did not open for the season due to the COVID-19 pandemic.
2021: On March 2, U.S. Bankruptcy Court Judge Jeffery A. Deller approved the sale of Conneaut Lake Park to Keldon Holdings, LLC for the amount of $1,200,000. Keldon was ultimately the only bidder for the property. The sale was estimated to cover 60% of the park's remaining liabilities. On March 17, the new ownership announced that "blighted wood" was being removed, and that the safety of unspecified rides was being evaluated. The Tumble Bug was placed into storage with the intention of it returning in 2022, before it was deemed beyond repair. The Blue Streak was also announced to be closed for the year.
2022: On January 4, 2022, while the Blue Streak roller coaster was being demolished, a controlled burn used to dispose of the discarded wood spread to the portion of the coaster which was still standing. Part of the Blue Streak was destroyed in the fire. No announcement of the coaster's closure had been made prior to its demolition.
In March of 2022, the Splash City Water Park was demolished, leaving only a portion of the Cliffhanger Falls water slide standing, which was later demolished.

Rides

Roller coasters

Other rides

Splash City

Splash City was a water park located in the middle of the park. It contained three attractions: Cliffhanger Falls, Connie Otter's Kiddie Cove, and Otter Creek River Adventure. There were also two decks on the island of the lazy river for sunbathing. They could be accessed by a bridge on the right end of the lazy river. The slides were added in 1986, and the rest of the water park was added in 1991. They operated from 1986-1994, 1996-2006, and 2009-2010. It sat idle from 2011-2016. In October 2015, the park announced Splash City would be reopening in 2016. On May 28, 2016, Otter Creek River Adventure reopened to the public. On August 6, 2016, both Cliffhanger Falls and Connie Otter's Kiddie Cove reopened to the public. In March of 2022, Splash City was demolished. Only a portion of the Cliffhanger Falls water slide remained standing, which was later torn down.

Otter Creek Adventure River: A 160,000 gallon lazy river ride, with other water effects such as a mushroom sprinkler and waterfall.

Cliffhanger Falls: A pair of two 415-foot-long water slides. To get to the top, riders climbed several sets of stairs, up a 48-foot-tall tower.

Connie Otter's Kiddie Cove: A children's splash pool, with three attractions. These included a small water slide in one corner, a waterfall with a walkway behind it in another corner, and a fountain in the center of the pool. It was located directly behind Cliffhanger Falls.

Kiddieland

Kiddieland is a small, enclosed section of the park, containing 13 rides specifically for children. It is located behind the Carousel and across from the Witch's Stew and Trabant. It can be accessed from either behind the carousel, or the main entrance across from the Witch's Stew. The original Kiddieland restrooms were destroyed by a fire in 2010. They have since been rebuilt.

The following rides are in Kiddieland: Dune Buggies, G.I. Joe Jeeps, Hot Pursuit, Little Dipper, Pony Parade, Swings, Tubs of Fun, Water Otters

The Kiddieland section of the park also offers pony rides in a small. circular, tethered track.

References

External links 

 
 Mike's Historic Amusement Park's Conneaut Lake Park Page
 CLP Junction
 Images of America: Conneaut Lake Park
 

Amusement parks opened in 1892
Amusement parks in Pennsylvania
Tourist attractions in Crawford County, Pennsylvania
1892 establishments in Pennsylvania
Buildings and structures in Crawford County, Pennsylvania
Companies that filed for Chapter 11 bankruptcy in 1995
Companies that filed for Chapter 11 bankruptcy in 2014
Companies that filed for Chapter 11 bankruptcy in 2021